To’Hajiilee, Cañoncito Band of Navajos is a non-contiguous section of the Navajo Nation lying in parts of western Bernalillo, eastern Cibola, and southwestern Sandoval counties in the U.S. state of New Mexico, west of the city of Albuquerque. It is a Navajo phrase roughly translated in English as "Dipping Water."

It was formed on the "Long Walk," during the forced relocation of Navajo tribal people, in 1864. Residents there claim that people who settled there, were considered (and still are, infrequently) a renegade band who refused to go further and settled in this part of New Mexico known as the checkerboard, where both Pueblo and Navajo people share the land and live to this day.

Description 
It has a land area of 121.588 square miles (314.911 km²) and a 2000 census population of 1,649 people. The land area is only about 0.5% of the entire Navajo Nation's total. The name comes from the Navajo phrase tó hajiileé, meaning "where people draw up water by means of a cord or rope one quantity after another."

In popular culture 
 The final scenes of The Ghostway novel by Tony Hillerman, published in 1984, take place in Cañoncito Reservation.
 Tohajiilee is a recurring location on the television series Breaking Bad (2008–2013); the 13th episode of its final season, "To'hajiilee," is named after the reservation.
 Tohajiilee returned in Breaking Bad spin-off prequel Better Call Saul as a filming location in the episode "Bagman", depicting a fictional location near the US-Mexico border

References 

 Canoncito Indian Reservation (Tribal Census Tract 9459), Navajo Reservation and Off-Reservation Trust Land, Arizona/New Mexico/Utah United States Census Bureau

Geography of the Navajo Nation
American Indian reservations in New Mexico
Populated places on the Navajo Nation